Opogona autogama is a moth of the family Tineidae.

Distribution
It is found in the Seychelles and Mauritius.

This species has a wingspan of 12–13 mm, head is purplish-fuscous, tuft brownish-ochreous, fillet and face shining greyish-ochreous.
Forewings lanceolate, bronzy-grey or light purplish-fuscous,

In male: a long light grey subcostal hairpencil from base lying beneath forewings
this character is quite distinctive.

References
Original publication: Meyrick, 1911. No. XII. Tortricina and Tineina. Results of the Percy Sladen Trust Expedition to the Indian Ocean in 1905 Trans. Linn. Soc. Lond. (2) 14 : 263–307

Moths described in 1911
Opogona